Long Look (1962 – after 1970) was an American-bred, Irish-trained Thoroughbred racehorse and broodmare. After showing promising form as a juvenile in 1964 she developed into a top-class performer in the following year. She recorded her biggest win in the Epsom Oaks as well as finishing second in the Irish Oaks, third in the Prix Vermeille and fourth in the 1000 Guineas. As a broodmare she produced three foals, all of which won races.

Background
Long Look was bay mare with a small white star bred in Kentucky by her owner James Cox Brady, a financier who served as chairman of the NYRA from 1961 to 1969. She was sent to race in Europe and entered training with Vincent O'Brien at Ballydoyle.

She was sired by Ribot, the undefeated, Italian-trained champion who won consecutive runnings of the Prix de l'Arc de Triomphe in 1955 and 1956. As a breeding stallion he was an outstanding sire of middle-distance and staying horses including Ragusa, Ribocco, Ribero, Molvedo, Prince Royal, Boucher, Tom Rolfe, Arts and Letters, Graustark and His Majesty. Long Look's dam Santorin won only one minor race but was a daughter of James Brady's Acorn Stakes winner Secret Meeting. She was also a half-sister to Tomina, the female-line ancestor of many good winners including Fasliyev and Misty For Me.

Racing career

1964: two-year-old season
Long Look began her track career by winning the Larragh Stakes over seven furlongs at Leopardstown Racecourse. She was then moved up in class and distance and matched against male opposition when she contested the Beresford Stakes over one mile at the Curragh. She finished unplaced in a race won by the gelding Jealous.

1965: three-year-old season
On her first appearance as a three-year-old, Long Look finished unplaced in the Madrid Free Handicap in April. Despite her modest form she was then sent to England for the 1000 Guineas over the Rowley Mile at Newmarket and produced a much better performance, coming home fourth of the sixteen runners behind Night Off, Yami and Mabel.

Long Look was then moved up in distance for the 187th running of the Oaks Stakes over one and a half miles at Epsom Racecourse on 4 June and started at odds of 100/7 (14/1) in a sixteen-runner field. Ridden by the Australian jockey Jack Purtell she won "in fine style" by one and a half lengths from Mabel with Ruby's Princess three quarters of a length back in third.

In July Long Look started odds-on favourite for the Irish Oaks at the Curragh but was beaten into second place by her unfancied stablemate Aurabella. She failed to win in two subsequent races, producing the better performance when finishing third behind Aunt Edith and Dark Wave in the Prix Vermeille at Longchamp Racecourse in September.

Breeding record
At the end of her racing career, Long Look was retired to become a broodmare for her owner's stud. She produced three filly foals, all of whom won races:

Point Gammon, a bay filly, foaled in 1968, sired by Bold Lad. Won three races.
Come Back, chestnut filly, 1969, by Bold Lad. Won three races including the Listed Prix de l'Elevage. Grand-dam of Ocean Falls (Prix Quincey) and Pigeon Voyageur (Gran Premio d'Italia).
North Broadway, dark bay or brown filly, 1970, by Bold Ruler. Won eleven races including the Grade II Sheepshead Bay Stakes.

Assessment and honours
In their book, A Century of Champions, based on the Timeform rating system, John Randall and Tony Morris rated Long Look a "poor" winner of the Oaks.

Pedigree

Through her dam Santorin, Long Look was inbred 4 × 4 to Hyperion, meaning that this stallion appears twice in the fourth generation of her pedigree.

References

1962 racehorse births
Racehorses bred in Kentucky
Racehorses trained in Ireland
Thoroughbred family 16-h
Epsom Oaks winners